Ras Sedr (Also spelled: Ras Sidr, Ras Sudr, or Ras Sudar) is an Egyptian town located on the Gulf of Suez and the Red Sea coast. It is a part of the South Sinai Governorate, and consists of three areas: Wadi Sidr, Abu Sidr and Soerp. The region has been known since ancient biblical times. Ras Sudr was the last point of Sinai that was conquered by the Israelis on 8 June 1967 during the Six Day War, the town had a readily event known as the Ras Sedr Massacre when Israelis killed Egyptian POW.

Geography
Ras Sidr is 200 km from Cairo and approx 60 km from the Ahmed Hamdi Tunnel crossing in Suez, on the western side of the Sinai Peninsula, and almost opposite the resort of Ayn El Sokhna on the opposite Red Sea coastline. The main travelling road to Ras Sidr is by way of the main Suez to Sharm el Sheikh Road through almost total desert terrain. The road is dotted with farms where olives, tamarinds, and fruits are grown.

The majority of the town and outlying districts are inhabited by Sinai Bedouins who live in the areas of Wadi Abu Sidr and Soerp. Ras Sedr itself is made up of two residential areas, bisected by the main north/south road. One side contains local housing for workers, who mainly come from the north of Egypt and the Nile Valley. The other contains private villa residences for professionals and second holiday homes whose owners are mainly from Cairo. There is also a large souk area with many shops and services including telephone, post office, internet services, council offices and a police station. Tradesmen of every kind can be found in the artisans' souk area. There is also a small military airstrip, which is being debated whether to build a civilian airport there or the military continues to use it.

Attractions
Ras Sidr has a 95 km beach coastline which offers waters for swimming and sea sports. The area also attracts bird watchers as tourists can see different species of migrating birds. Shallow water beaches and constantly blowing wind, makes Ras. Sedr one of the best kite surfing sites in the world. Recently, several kite surfing centers have opened along the cost. The artificial lakes in Holiday Inn Fantasia & La Hacienda beach resort are suitable for beginners as the wind carries the kite surfers towards the beach not away from it.

Climate 
Köppen-Geiger climate classification system classifies its climate as hot desert (BWh).

See also
 Ras Muhammad National Park
 Ras Sedr massacre
 Dahab
 Taba
 Nuweiba
 Sharm el-Sheikh
 List of cities and towns in Egypt

References 

Populated places in South Sinai Governorate
Seaside resorts in Egypt
Red Sea Riviera